Sarab or Sar Ab is a residential area in Afghanistan located in Jaghatu, Ghazni Province.

See also 
 Ghazni Province

Note 

Jaghatū District
Populated places in Ghazni Province
Ghazni Province
Hazarajat